North Berkeley station is an underground Bay Area Rapid Transit (BART) station located on Sacramento Street in Berkeley, California. The station serves the North Berkeley neighborhood and the surrounding areas. It is bounded by Virginia Street, Sacramento Street, Delaware Street, and Acton Street in a residential area north of University Avenue. The main station entrance sits within a circular building at the center of a parking lot, while an elevator between the surface and the platform is located at the parking lot's Sacramento Street edge.

History
The site was originally an open area across which the Key System constructed its Westbrae streetcar line, subsequently given the letter designation "G".  The tracks ran diagonally across the property in virtually the same alignment as today's underground BART tracks.  Homes began to be constructed along the periphery of the site, and after the G-Westbrae line was closed in 1941, filled in most of the rest of it. All of these were demolished in the 1960s to make way for construction of the North Berkeley station.

Service at the station began on January 29, 1973.

Pursuant to a law passed by the state of California in 2018, the City of Berkeley and BART are beginning to plan the development of transit-oriented housing on the station parking lot, with a deadline for zoning due to the district in 2020. The station site is only partially suited for housing due to the presence of the tracks and station box underneath. The Berkeley City Council approved a memorandum of understanding with BART in December 2019.

The elevator to the platform is outside of the paid area. BART plans to add a dedicated faregate for the elevator in 2022.

See also
List of Bay Area Rapid Transit stations

References

External links 

BART - North Berkeley

Bay Area Rapid Transit stations in Alameda County, California
Stations on the Orange Line (BART)
Stations on the Red Line (BART)
Buildings and structures in Berkeley, California
Railway stations in the United States opened in 1973